Karl George Emeléus  (4 August 1901 in London–18 June 1989 in Belfast) was an English experimental physicist who spent half a century on the staff at Queen's University Belfast.  His early research in detection of nuclear radiation led on to a lifetime of research into the conduction of electricity through gases.

Biography
Emeléus was the son of Karl Henry Emeléus and Ellen Briggs, the brother of inorganic chemist Harry Julius Emeléus and the father of petrologist Henry Emeleus.  In 1928 he married Florence Mary Chambers, and they had four children – three sons and one daughter.   He was known professionally as K. G. Emeléus or simply KGE, and by family and friends as George.

Education
Emeléus was educated at Hastings Grammar School and at St John's College, Cambridge and was awarded BA in 1922.  Upon graduation, he joined the Cavendish Laboratory where he worked as a research student under Ernest Rutherford and James Chadwick.  Working with the latter he built a large Wilson cloud chamber and this led to his lifelong interest in gaseous electronics.

He then worked with Edward Appleton and in 1925 followed him when he was appointed to a post at King's College London.  There, in 1926, he completed his thesis on "Methods for detecting single ionizing particles", for which Cambridge awarded him a PhD.

Career
In 1927 he joined Queen's University Belfast (QUB) as a lecturer in Physics and later became Professor of Physics (1933–66).

Early in his career he wrote the book The Conduction of Electricity Through Gases. Electronics grew out of this sort of work in the early 20th century.  During his long tenure at QUB he researched extensively into the conduction of electricity through gases, publishing more than 100 papers.  He continued publication of his research almost until his death.

Books
 The Conduction of Electricity Through Gases (Methuen, 1929, second edition 1936, third edition 1951)
 Discharges in Electronegative Gases,Taylor & Francis Ltd (Jan 01, 1970),

Awards
He was awarded the title Commander of the British Empire in 1965 and was a member of the Royal Irish Academy. The Karl George Emeléus physics prize was established in 1984 by former students and friends for physics students at QUB.

References

External links 
 

People educated at Hastings Grammar School
Alumni of King's College London
Alumni of St John's College, Cambridge
20th-century British physicists
English physicists
Experimental physicists
Plasma physicists
Academics of Queen's University Belfast
1901 births
1989 deaths